Vygantas Čekaitis (28 March 1961 - 22 June 2008) was a Lithuanian sprint canoer. He won two medals at the 1981 ICF Canoe Sprint World Championships in Nottingham with a silver in the C-2 500 m and a bronze in the C-2 1000 m events. 12 times Lithuanian champion (1979-1984).

References

Soviet male canoeists
Lithuanian male canoeists
ICF Canoe Sprint World Championships medalists in Canadian
1961 births
2008 deaths